Dendropsophus kamagarini is a frog in the family Hylidae.  It is endemic to Bolivia, Peru and Brazil.  Scientists have seen it between 150 and 1696 meters above sea level.

References

Endemic fauna of Peru
Amphibians of Peru
Endemic fauna of Bolivia
Amphibians of Bolivia
Endemic fauna of Brazil
Amphibians of Brazil
Amphibians described in 2018
kamagarini